The Aldgate School (formerly Sir John Cass's Foundation Primary School) is a Church of England primary school located in the City of London, England. It is the only state-funded school in the City of London. The last Ofsted report in 2013 classed it as "Outstanding". The school was founded in 1709 in the churchyard of St Botolph's Aldgate.

The school was previously named after Sir John Cass but was renamed The Aldgate School in September 2020 due to Cass's links with the Atlantic slave trade.

Catchment
The Aldgate School admits pupils from the age of 4 (Reception) to the 6th year. There is currently one class of approximately 30 students per year. The school has a small priority catchment area that includes all of the City of London plus a few streets to the east, as far as the A1202 road, Commercial Street, Leman Street and Royal Mint Street.

In the 2016 reception class, a bulge class was established. For the first time, there were two classes of 30 pupils starting in September 2016. This class moved through the school year-on-year. There will not be an additional class at all levels, just one bulge class.

References

External links
 
 
Ofsted Reports

1709 establishments in England
Primary schools in the City of London
Educational institutions established in 1709
Voluntary aided schools in London
Church of England primary schools in the Diocese of London
Grade II* listed buildings in the City of London
Name changes due to the George Floyd protests